Onel Lázaro Hernández Mayea (born 1 February 1993) is a Cuban professional footballer who plays as a winger for  club Norwich City and the Cuba national team.

He emigrated to Germany as a child, and played in the 2. Bundesliga for Arminia Bielefeld and Eintracht Braunschweig. In January 2018, he signed for Norwich City, with whom he became the first Cuban to play and score in the Premier League. He spent the 2021–22 season on loan at EFL Championship clubs Middlesbrough and Birmingham City.

Club career

Germany
Born in Morón, Cuba, Hernández came through the academy system at TuS Westfalia Neuenkirchen, FC Gütersloh 2000, Rot Weiss Ahlen and Arminia Bielefeld. He made his professional league debut for Arminia Bielefeld in the 2. Bundesliga against SC Paderborn 07 on 1 October 2010. In this game, he was substituted in the 78th minute for Franck Manga Guela by Christian Ziege. He played 28 league games for Arminia Bielefeld from 2010 to 2012. After two years he moved to SV Werder Bremen II. On 10 January 2014, Hernández moved to VfL Wolfsburg II.

On 2 June 2016, Hernández signed with 2. Bundesliga club Eintracht Braunschweig for the 2016–17 season.

Norwich City
Hernández moved to EFL Championship club Norwich City on 25 January 2018, signing a 3-year contract under German manager Daniel Farke. He made his debut on 3 February in a 1–0 home win over Middlesbrough, as an 86th-minute substitute for Josh Murphy. On 4 August 2018, in the first game of the new season, he scored his first goals in a 2–2 draw at Birmingham City, and added seven more as the Canaries were promoted as champions.

On 9 August 2019, Hernández came on as a second-half substitute in Norwich's 4–1 away defeat to Liverpool, becoming the first Cuban to play in the Premier League. He was the first of his countrymen to score in the league too on 27 October, in a 3–1 loss to Manchester United at Carrow Road.

Hernández joined Championship club Middlesbrough in August 2021 on loan for the season. He scored his first goal for the club in a 2–0 win at Nottingham Forest on 15 September. His loan spell was terminated on 14 January 2022, allowing him to join another Championship club, Birmingham City, on loan until the end of the season.

Hernández went straight into Birmingham's starting eleven for the following day's visit to Preston North End and played 83 minutes of the 1–1 draw. A week later, he ran onto a well placed through ball from Lukas Jutkiewicz and "just had to pass it past the keeper" to open the scoring in a 2–1 win over Barnsley. He was a regular for the remainder of the season, used as a wing-back as well as a winger, and scored three goals from 22 appearances.

Hernández returned to Norwich for the 2022–23 season, but was used mainly as a substitute in the first half of the campaign. He came off the bench to score a stoppage-time winner against former club Birmingham in late August, but it was only after David Wagner replaced Dean Smith as manager in January 2023 that he became a regular in the starting eleven and repaid Wagner's faith with increased productivity. His second goal of the season came in a 4–2 victory away to Coventry City in late January, he supplied two assists as Norwich beat Hull City 3–1 in February, and his assist for Gabriel Sara in a win against Millwall that took his team into the play-off positions was his fifth.

International career
Hernández has represented Germany once at the under-18 level, in a match against Ukraine in 2010.

In November 2018, Hernández was called up for the first time by Cuba, but could not play due to political rules against foreign-based players. In March 2021, he was called up for a second time, and made his international debut in their 2022 FIFA World Cup qualification match against Guatemala. On his second appearance, he scored his first goal for the country, equalising in a 2–1 loss to Curaçao.

Personal life
Hernández grew up in Gütersloh after having emigrated from Cuba to Germany with his mother and sister at the age of six. He was introduced to football by his German stepfather, who believed it would help Hernández integrate better into German society.

Hernández became a fan favourite at Norwich after a January 2019 interview in which he spoke in praise of catalogue retailer Argos, who gave him a catalogue signed by their CEO as a souvenir. He did a signing event at their Norwich outlet in March.

Career statistics

Club

International

Scores and results list Cuba's goal tally first, score column indicates score after each Hernández goal.

Honours
Norwich City
EFL Championship: 2018–19, 2020–21

References

1993 births
Living people
People from Morón, Cuba
Cuban footballers
Cuba international footballers
German footballers
Germany youth international footballers
Association football wingers
VfL Wolfsburg II players
SV Werder Bremen II players
Arminia Bielefeld players
Eintracht Braunschweig players
Norwich City F.C. players
Middlesbrough F.C. players
Birmingham City F.C. players
Regionalliga players
2. Bundesliga players
3. Liga players
English Football League players
Premier League players
German people of Cuban descent
Cuban emigrants to Germany
Cuban expatriate footballers
Cuban expatriates in the United Kingdom
German expatriate footballers
German expatriate sportspeople in England
Expatriate footballers in England